Municipal solid waste is a waste type that includes predominantly household waste.

Municipal waste may also refer to:

 Municipal Waste (band), a crossover thrash group
 Municipal Waste (EP), their 2001 album